The word Erlenmeyer may mean:
 Richard August Carl Emil Erlenmeyer (1825–1909), German chemist
 Erlenmeyer flask, conical glassware invented by Richard Erlenmeyer
 The bony deformity named Deformity type Erlenmeyer flask because of  the similarity to the shape of the flask
 Friedrich Gustav Carl Emil Erlenmeyer (1864–1921), son of R. A. C. E. Erlenmeyer
 Erlenmeyer Rule proposed by R. A. C. E. Erlenmeyer
 "The Erlenmeyer Flask", an episode of the television series The X-Files